Earl W. (Wadsworth) McDaniel (April 15, 1926 – May 4, 1997) was a Regents Professor of Physics at the Georgia Institute of Technology and the Georgia Tech Research Institute and is most noted for his contributions to the field of ion mobility spectrometry.

Education and early career

After completing his undergraduate degree in physics at the Georgia Institute of Technology and earning his Ph.D. from the University of Michigan, McDaniel was recruited by Georgia Tech Research Institute director James Boyd to return to Georgia Tech as an assistant professor. He received appointments in both the School of Physics and the School of Electrical Engineering.

Apart from his work as a physicist, McDaniel was known to be an avid reader of both fiction and classics as well as an expert on the histories of great military conflicts and battles.

Drift tube
In 1964, Earl began construction of a "drift tube" with the help of mechanical engineering student, Dan Albritton. Using this drift tube the pair revolutionized the field of ion transport. Their publication "Mobilities of Mass-Identified H3+ and H+ Ions in Hydrogen"  was chosen as one of the top 100 papers ever published in the journal Physical Review.

Publications
Aside from a number of popular research publications, McDaniel also authored or edited 8 books. Among these, the most notable were "Collision Phenomena in Ionized Gases," “Transport Properties of Ions in Gases,” "Atomic Collisions: Electron and Photon Projectiles,” and “Atomic Collisions: Heavy Particle Projectiles.” These books were published in a number of countries and translated into multiple languages.

References

1926 births
1997 deaths
People from Macon, Georgia
Georgia Tech faculty
Georgia Tech Research Institute people
Georgia Tech alumni
Particle physicists
20th-century American physicists
University of Michigan alumni
Fellows of the American Physical Society